Wipsowo  is a village in the administrative district of Gmina Barczewo, within Olsztyn County, Warmian-Masurian Voivodeship, in northern Poland.

The village has a population of 764.

Notable residents
 Emil Stürtz (1892-1945), Nazi politician

References

Wipsowo